Dominik Hrbatý was the defending champion, but was forced to withdraw in his first round match against Marcelo Filippini due to a muscle strain.

Galo Blanco won the title by defeating Albert Portas 4–6, 6–4, 6–3 in the final.

Seeds

Draw

Finals

Top half

Bottom half

References

External links
 Official results archive (ATP)
 Official results archive (ITF)

San Marino CEPU Open
1999 ATP Tour